Sherry Willis-Burch (born February 17, 1956) is an American actress who had a brief career in the 1980s, starring in the horror films Final Exam (1981) and Killer Party (1986).

Biography 
Burch was born and raised in Texas. Her only two film credits are major roles in the horror film Final Exam (1981) as Janet and the lead in William Fruet's Killer Party (1986) as Vivia. She was also set to appear in the film The Last Prom, although this project was later scrapped.

She received the part of Janet in Final Exam when, while working for the films production company MPM, the producers saw her in a play.

Burch disappeared from the industry after Killer Party (1986), but she reappeared for an interview and commentary on both DVD releases of Final Exam (1981), where she stated, "for someone who doesn't like slasher flicks, I made two!" Following her film appearances, Burch began a career as a schoolteacher in Los Angeles.

Burch portrayed 'Cass' in the stage production of The Real Queen Of Hearts Ain't Even Pretty at The Actors Playhouse in Los Angeles, in the fall of 1983, as well as other local productions, including for the Hermosa Beach Community Theatre.

References

External links 
 

Actresses from Texas
American film actresses
American stage actresses
Living people
20th-century American women
21st-century American women
1956 births